Ghiyasuddin Bahadur Shah I was the son and successor of Sultan Shamsuddin Firoz Shah of the Bengal kingdom of Lakhnauti. He ruled the kingdom as an independent ruler during 1322-1324 CE and as a governor during 1324-1328 CE.

History
Ghiyasuddin Bahadur Shah issued coins when his father was still living. On the death of his father he ascended the throne in 1322. Ghiyasuddin Tughlaq, Sultan of Delhi, declared war against him in 1324. After losing the battle, Bahadur Shah was captured and taken to Delhi as a prisoner. Bengal was thus turned into a province of the Delhi Sultanate.

In the same year, Delhi Sultan Muhammad bin Tughlaq, son and successor of Ghiyasuddin Tughlaq, released him and appointed him to govern Sonargaon as a province.  Bahadur Shah founded a new city, Ghiyaspur, at a site 24 Kilometre southwest of present-day Mymensingh.

He asserted independence in 1328. Sultan Muhammad bin Tughlaq sent his general, Bahram Khan, to depose him. In the battle, Bahadur Shah was defeated and killed. Bahram Khan recaptured Sonargaon for the Delhi Sultanate and he became the governor of Sonargaon.

See also
List of rulers of Bengal
History of Bengal
History of India

References

Sultans of Bengal
1328 deaths
Year of birth unknown